In mathematics, specifically algebraic topology, semi-locally simply connected is a certain local connectedness condition that arises in the theory of covering spaces. Roughly speaking, a topological space X is semi-locally simply connected if there is a lower bound on the sizes of the “holes” in X. This condition is necessary for most of the theory of covering spaces, including the existence of a universal cover and the Galois correspondence between covering spaces and subgroups of the fundamental group.

Most “nice” spaces such as manifolds and CW complexes are semi-locally simply connected, and topological spaces that do not satisfy this condition are considered somewhat pathological. The standard example of a non-semi-locally simply connected space is the Hawaiian earring.

Definition
A space X is called semi-locally simply connected if every point in X has a neighborhood U with the property that every loop in U can be contracted to a single point within X (i.e. every loop in U is nullhomotopic in X). The neighborhood U need not be simply connected: though every loop in U must be contractible within X, the contraction is not required to take place inside of U. For this reason, a space can be semi-locally simply connected without being locally simply connected.

Equivalent to this definition, a space X is semi-locally simply connected if every point in X has a neighborhood U for which the homomorphism from the fundamental group of U to the fundamental group of X, induced by the inclusion map of U into X, is trivial.

Most of the main theorems about covering spaces, including the existence of a universal cover and the Galois correspondence, require a space to be path-connected, locally path-connected, and semi-locally simply connected, a condition known as unloopable (délaçable in French). In particular, this condition is necessary for a space to have a simply connected covering space.

Examples

A simple example of a space that is not semi-locally simply connected is the Hawaiian earring: the union of the circles in the Euclidean plane with centers (1/n, 0) and radii 1/n, for n a natural number. Give this space the subspace topology. Then all neighborhoods of the origin contain circles that are not nullhomotopic.

The Hawaiian earring can also be used to construct a semi-locally simply connected space that is not locally simply connected. In particular, the cone on the Hawaiian earring is contractible and therefore semi-locally simply connected, but it is clearly not locally simply connected.

Topology of fundamental group
In terms of the natural topology on the fundamental group, a locally path-connected space is semi-locally simply connected if and only if its quasitopological fundamental group is discrete.

References 

 J.S. Calcut, J.D. McCarthy Discreteness and homogeneity of the topological fundamental group Topology Proceedings, Vol. 34,(2009), pp. 339–349

Algebraic topology
Homotopy theory
Properties of topological spaces